La Porte City is a city in Black Hawk County, Iowa, United States.  The population was 2,284 at the 2020 census. It is part of the Waterloo–Cedar Falls Metropolitan Statistical Area.

History
La Porte City was platted in 1855. It is named after La Porte, Indiana, the former home of one of its founders.

Geography

Demographics

2010 census
As of the census of 2010, there were 2,285 people, 915 households, and 601 families living in the city. The racial makeup of the city was 97.8% White, 0.8% African American, 0.1% Native American, 0.2% Asian, 0.1% from other races, and 1.0% from two or more races. Hispanic or Latino of any race were 1.0% of the population.

There were 915 households, of which 34.5% had children under the age of 18 living with them, 52.6% were married couples living together, 9.6% had a female householder with no husband present, 3.5% had a male householder with no wife present, and 34.3% were non-families. 29.9% of all households were made up of individuals, and 15.3% had someone living alone who was 65 years of age or older. The average household size was 2.45 and the average family size was 3.04.

The median age in the city was 39.6 years. 27% of residents were under the age of 18; 5.5% were between the ages of 18 and 24; 24.9% were from 25 to 44; 24.4% were from 45 to 64; and 18.3% were 65 years of age or older. The gender makeup of the city was 47.0% male and 53.0% female.

2000 census
As of the census of 2000, there were 2,275 people, 936 households, and 643 families living in the city. The racial makeup of the city was 99.16% White, 0.13% African American, 0.22% Native American, 0.09% Asian, 0.04% from other races, and 0.35% from two or more races. Hispanic or Latino of any race were 0.22% of the population.

There were 936 households, out of which 33.0% had children under the age of 18 living with them, 55.7% were married couples living together, 10.6% had a female householder with no husband present, and 31.3% were non-families. 28.2% of all households were made up of individuals, and 16.5% had someone living alone who was 65 years of age or older. The average household size was 2.43 and the average family size was 2.97.

In the city, the population was spread out, with 26.4% under the age of 18, 8.0% from 18 to 24, 26.3% from 25 to 44, 20.7% from 45 to 64, and 18.6% who were 65 years of age or older. The median age was 37 years. For every 100 females, there were 91.3 males. For every 100 females age 18 and over, there were 86.3 males.

The median income for a household in the city was $37,540, and the median income for a family was $46,544. Males had a median income of $31,629 versus $22,133 for females. The per capita income for the city was $19,266. About 4.1% of families and 6.2% of the population were below the poverty line, including 6.6% of those under age 18 and 7.5% of those age 65 or over.

Education
Union Community School District serves the municipality. The district was established on July 1, 1993 by the merger of the La Porte City Community School District and the Dysart-Geneseo Community School District.

Notable people
 Fran Allison, old-time radio and early TV personality
 Patrick Bedard, automotive journalist and driver in the 1983 & 1984 Indianapolis 500
 Peg Mullen (1917–2009), anti-war activist and writer.

References

 
Cities in Black Hawk County, Iowa
Cities in Iowa
Waterloo – Cedar Falls metropolitan area
1855 establishments in Iowa
Populated places established in 1855